Trooper(s) or The Trooper may refer to:

Military or police forces
 Trooper (rank), a military private rank
 Trooper (police rank), a rank used by some police agencies
 Airtrooper, a military private rank of the British Army Air Corps
 Troopship, or Trooper, a ship used to transport soldiers
 The Trooper (statue), or The Troopie, a Rhodesian war memorial

Music
 Trooper (band), a Canadian rock band
 Trooper (album), by Trooper, 1975
 Trooper (Romanian band), a heavy metal band
 "The Trooper", a 1983 song by Iron Maiden
 The Trooper, a 1994 EP by Sentenced
 Troopers Drum and Bugle Corps, of Casper, Wyoming

People
 The Trooper (wrestler), or The Patriot, Del Wilkes (born 1961), American professional wrestler
 Trooper Johnson, American Paralympic basketball coach and former player
 Trooper Taylor (born 1970), American college football coach
 Trooper Washington (1944–2004), American basketball player

Other uses
 Trooper, Pennsylvania, US
 The Trooper (film), or The Fighting Trooper, a 1934 American Western film
 Colt Trooper, a revolver
 Isuzu Trooper, an SUV
 Hambantota Troopers, a Sri Lankan domestic T20 cricket team

See also
 Stormtrooper (disambiguation)
 Super Trouper (disambiguation)
 Troop (disambiguation)
 Troupe (disambiguation)